PukiWiki is wiki software written in PHP, and is widely used by Japanese wikis. Since version 1.4, PukiWiki Development Team became the developer of the software.

Features 
The support for DBCS of PukiWiki is wider than most wiki software, due to its origination in Japan. Due to the heavy use of mobile phones for browsing the web in Japan, PukiWiki also have a layout optimized for mobile use.

PukiWiki can run on PHP 4, 5, 7 or 8. It supports interwiki links and extensions, similar to MediaWiki.

PukiWiki is written such that it uses PHP with a series of text files, hence does not require a database to operate, and does not support databases natively. However, support could be added through extensions for MySQL, SQLite, Oracle Oci8 and PostgreSQL.

Derivative Versions 
xpWiki - Developed by nao-pon and forked from PukiWiki version 1.4.7, and aims at integration with XOOPS.
PukiWiki Mod - Also developed by nao-pon with the same goal, but forked from version 1.3.x instead.
PukiWiki Plus! - Derivative version with enhanced localization features.
PukiWiki Advance - Forked from PukiWiki Plus!.
PyukiWiki - Derivative version written in Perl.

References

External links 
Official Website 

Free wiki software
Free content management systems
Cross-platform free software